Mustafa Mohammed (born 14 January 1998) is an Iraqi footballer who plays as a defender for Al-Zawraa in Iraqi Premier League, as well as the Iraq national team.

International career
On 28 February 2018, Mustafa earned his first international cap with Iraq against Saudi Arabia in a friendly.

Personal life
Mustafa's younger brother Muntadher Mohammed is also a footballer and was his teammate at Al-Zawraa between 2019 and 2021.

Honours

Club
Al-Zawraa
Iraqi Premier League: 2017–18
Iraq FA Cup: 2018–19

References

External links
 

1998 births
Living people
Association football defenders
Iraqi footballers
Iraq international footballers
Al-Zawraa SC players
Place of birth missing (living people)
Al-Shorta SC players